Clendon Park School is a primary school (Years 1–8) in Manurewa, a suburb of Manukau City, Auckland Region, New Zealand.

Clendon Park has two bilingual units (Years 1–8). A Maori bilingual unit (Te Whanau Awhina) was established in 2000 and it currently consists of seven classes. The students in this unit often achieve above the national norms. A Samoan bilingual unit (Tautua Mo Tupulaga) began in 2006 and it currently comprises five classes.

See also
 Clendon Park

References

External links
 Clendon Park School Website
 Education Review Office report on Clendon Park Primary School, June 2011
 Education Review Office report on Clendon Park Primary School, July 2007

Primary schools in Auckland